The 2015 UConn Huskies football team represented the University of Connecticut during the 2015 NCAA Division I FBS football season as a member of the Eastern Division of the American Athletic Conference. They played their home games at Rentschler Field. They were led by second-year head coach Bob Diaco. They finished the season 6–7, 4–4 in American Athletic play to finish in a tie for third place in the East Division. They were invited to the St. Petersburg Bowl where they lost to Marshall.

This was the last season the Huskies were bowl eligible until 2022.

Schedule

Schedule Source:

Game summaries

Villanova

Army

at No. 22 Missouri

Navy

at BYU

at UCF

South Florida

at Cincinnati

East Carolina

at Tulane

No. 13 Houston

at No. 25 Temple

vs. Marshall (St. Petersburg Bowl)

References

UConn
UConn Huskies football seasons
UConn Huskies football